The 2017–18 Liga II was the 5th season, since its reintroduction in 2013, of the second level women's football league of the Romanian football league system. Since the previous season, the second tier league was renamed from Liga I to Liga II, since the top tier got renamed again to Liga I. 16 teams divided in 2 series played in the competition that consisted of a double round-robin lasting 14 stages, totaling 112 matches.

Team changes

To Liga II
Promoted from Liga III (previously called Liga II)
 Onix Râmnicu Sărat (runners-up of 2016–17 Liga II)
 Piroș Security Arad (winners of 2016–17 Liga II)

Relegated from Liga I (previously called Superliga)
 Navobi Iași (runners-up of 2016–17 Superliga, willingly enrolled in Liga II)
 Independența Baia Mare (10th in 2016–17 Superliga)

From Liga II (previously called Liga I)
Promoted to Liga I
 CS Universitatea Alexandria (winners of 2016–17 Liga I, Seria I)
 Fortuna Becicherecu Mic (runners-up of 2016–17 Liga I, Seria II)

Relegated to Liga III
 CSM Pașcani (8th place in 2016–17 Liga I, Seria I)

Disbanded
 Juniorul Satu Mare (5th place in 2016–17 Liga I, Seria II)

Excluded and spared teams
Juniorul Satu Mare was disbanded in the summer of 2017, so Ladies Târgu Mureș (8th place in 2016–17 Liga I, Seria II) was spared from relegation.

Teams

Seria I

Seria II

League tables and Results

Seria I League table

Seria II League table

References

External links
 Official site

Rom
Fem
Women's football in Romania